Broadway Across America (BAA) is a presenter and producer of live theatrical events in the United States and Canada since 1982. It is currently owned by the John Gore Organization (formerly Key Brand Entertainment), which purchased it from Live Nation in 2008.

Through its network of presenting partners, BAA presents touring Broadway shows, family productions, and other live shows in over 40 North American venues. In 2008, Broadway Across America and its subsidiary Broadway Across Canada sold over 6.4 million tickets throughout its 40 theatres in the United States and Canada.

Acquisitions 
 1988: Zev Buffman Theatricals  — Miami Beach, Fort Lauderdale, Palm Beach, Orlando, Tampa, St. Petersburg
 1994: Theatre League of Atlanta — Atlanta
1998: Magicworks Entertainment — Salt Lake City
1998: American Artists — Boston
2000: Jujamcyn Productions — Minneapolis, Baltimore, Omaha, Portland, Milwaukee
2007: operations at Music Hall — Kansas City
2011: theatre at Peabody Opera House — St. Louis

Venues
As of October 2016, Broadway Across America presents shows at the following venues in the United States:

 Appleton, Wisconsin: Fox Cities
 Atlanta, Georgia: Fox Theatre
 Austin, Texas: Bass Concert Hall
 Baltimore, Maryland: Hippodrome Theatre
 Boston, Massachusetts: Boston Opera House, and Charles Playhouse
 Cincinnati, Ohio: Aronoff Center
 Columbus, Ohio: Ohio Theatre and Palace Theatre
 Fort Lauderdale, Florida: Broward Center and Parker Playhouse
 Houston, Texas: Hobby Center
 Indianapolis, Indiana: Clowes Memorial Hall, and Murat Theatre at Old National Centre
 Jacksonville, Florida: Times-Union Center
 Kansas City, Missouri: Municipal Auditorium
 Louisville, Kentucky: The Kentucky Center
 Madison, Wisconsin: Overture Center
 Miami, Florida: Adrienne Arsht Center
 Milwaukee, Wisconsin: Marcus Center
 Minneapolis, Minnesota: Orpheum Theatre, Pantages Theatre, and State Theatre
 New Orleans, Louisiana: Jackson Theater and Saenger Theatre
 Omaha, Nebraska: Orpheum Theatre
 Orange County, California: Segerstrom Center
 Orlando, Florida: Phillips Center
 Pittsburgh, Pennsylvania: Benedum Center and Heinz Hall
 Portland, Oregon: Arlene Schnitzer Concert Hall and Keller Auditorium
 Salt Lake City, Utah: Abravanel Hall, Capitol Theatre, Eccles Theater, and Kingsbury Hall
 San Antonio, Texas: Majestic Theatre
 Seattle, Washington: Paramount Theatre
 St Louis, Missouri: Peabody Opera House
 Tempe, Arizona: ASU Gammage

Notes

References

External links 
 Broadway Across America
 Key Brand Entertainment, Inc.
Performing groups established in 1984
1984 establishments in New York (state)